Dundocharax bidentatus is a species of distichodontid fish endemic to Angola, where it is found in the Lucoge River.

It is the only member of its genus.

References 

 

Distichodontidae

Freshwater fish of Angola
Endemic fauna of Angola
Taxa named by Max Poll
Fish described in 1967